A hoax is a widely publicized falsehood so fashioned as to invite reflexive, unthinking acceptance by the greatest number of people of the most varied social identities and of the highest possible social pretensions to gull its victims into putting up the highest possible social currency in support of the hoax. 

Whereas the promoters of frauds, fakes, and scams devise them so that they will withstand the highest degree of scrutiny customary in the affair, hoaxers are confident, justifiably or not, that their representations will receive no scrutiny at all.  They have such confidence  because their representations belong to a world of notions fundamental to the victims' views of reality, but whose truth and importance they accept without argument or evidence, and so never question. 

Some hoaxers intend eventually to unmask their representations as in fact a hoax so as to expose their victims as fools; seeking some form of profit, other hoaxers hope to maintain the hoax indefinitely, so that it is only when sceptical persons willing to investigate their claims publish their findings that at last they stand revealed as hoaxers.

History

Zhang Yingyu's The Book of Swindles ( 1617), published during the late Ming dynasty, is said to be China's first collection of stories about fraud, swindles, hoaxes, and other forms of deception. Although practical jokes have likely existed for thousands of years, one of the earliest recorded hoaxes in Western history was the drummer of Tedworth in 1661.  The communication of hoaxes can be accomplished in almost any manner that a fictional story can be communicated:  in person, via word of mouth, via words printed on paper, and so on.  As communications technology has advanced, the speed at which hoaxes spread has also advanced:  a rumor about a ghostly drummer, spread by word of mouth, will affect a relatively small area at first, then grow gradually.  However, hoaxes could also be spread via chain letters, which became easier as the cost of mailing a letter dropped.  The invention of the printing press in the 15th century brought down the cost of a mass-produced books and pamphlets, and the rotary printing press of the 19th century reduced the price even further (see yellow journalism).  During the 20th century, the hoax found a mass market in the form of supermarket tabloids, and by the 21st century there were fake news websites which spread hoaxes via social networking websites (in addition to the use of email for a modern type of chain letter).

Etymology
The English philologist Robert Nares (1753–1829) says that the word hoax was coined in the late 18th century as a contraction of the verb hocus, which means "to cheat," "to impose upon" or (according to Merriam-Webster) "to befuddle often with drugged liquor." Hocus is a shortening of the magic incantation hocus pocus, whose origin is disputed.

Definition
 Robert Nares defined the word hoax as meaning "to cheat," dating from Thomas Ady's 1656 book A candle in the dark, or a treatise on the nature of witches and witchcraft.

The term hoax is occasionally used in reference to urban legends and rumors, but the folklorist Jan Harold Brunvand argues that most of them lack evidence of deliberate creations of falsehood and are passed along in good faith by believers or as jokes, so the term should be used for only those with a probable conscious attempt to deceive. As for the closely related terms practical joke and prank, Brunvand states that although there are instances where they overlap, hoax tends to indicate "relatively complex and large-scale fabrications" and includes deceptions that go beyond the merely playful and "cause material loss or harm to the victim."

According to Professor Lynda Walsh of the University of Nevada, Reno, some hoaxessuch as the Great Stock Exchange Fraud of 1814, labeled as a hoax by contemporary commentatorsare financial in nature, and successful hoaxerssuch as P. T. Barnum, whose Fiji mermaid contributed to his wealthoften acquire monetary gain or fame through their fabrications, so the distinction between hoax and fraud is not necessarily clear. Alex Boese, the creator of the Museum of Hoaxes, states that the only distinction between them is the reaction of the public, because a fraud can be classified as a hoax when its method of acquiring financial gain creates a broad public impact or captures the imagination of the masses.

One of the earliest recorded media hoaxes is a fake almanac published by Jonathan Swift under the pseudonym of Isaac Bickerstaff in 1708. Swift predicted the death of John Partridge, one of the leading astrologers in England at that time, in the almanac and later issued an elegy on the day Partridge was supposed to have died. Partridge's reputation was damaged as a result and his astrological almanac was not published for the next six years.

It is possible to perpetrate a hoax by making only true statements using unfamiliar wording or context, such as in the Dihydrogen monoxide hoax. Political hoaxes are sometimes motivated by the desire to ridicule or besmirch opposing politicians or political institutions, often before elections.

A hoax differs from a magic trick or from fiction (books, film, theatre, radio, television, etc.) in that the audience is unaware of being deceived, whereas in watching a magician perform an illusion the audience expects to be tricked.

A hoax is often intended as a practical joke or to cause embarrassment, or to provoke social or political change by raising people's awareness of something. It can also emerge from a marketing or advertising purpose. For example, to market a romantic comedy film, a director staged a phony "incident" during a supposed wedding, which showed a bride and preacher getting knocked into a pool by a clumsy fall from a best man. A resulting video clip of Chloe and Keith's Wedding was uploaded to YouTube and was viewed by over 30 million people and the couple was interviewed by numerous talk shows. Viewers were deluded into thinking that it was an authentic clip of a real accident at a real wedding; but a story in USA Today in 2009 revealed it was a hoax.

Governments sometimes spread false information to facilitate their objectives, such as going to war. These often come under the heading of black propaganda. There is often a mixture of outright hoax and suppression and management of information to give the desired impression. In wartime and times of international tension rumors abound, some of which may be deliberate hoaxes.

Examples of politics-related hoaxes:
 Belgium is a country with a Flemish-speaking region and a French-speaking region. In 2006, French-speaking television channel RTBF interrupted programming with a spoof report claiming that the country had split in two and the royal family had fled.
 On 13 March 2010, the Imedi television station in Georgia broadcast a false announcement that Russia had invaded Georgia.

Psychologist Peter Hancock has identified six steps which characterise a truly successful hoax:
 Identify a constituencya person or group of people who, for reasons such as piety or patriotism, or greed, will truly care about your creation.
 Identify a particular dream which will make your hoax appeal to your constituency.
 Create an appealing but "under-specified" hoax, with ambiguities
 Have your creation discovered.
 Find at least one champion who will actively support your hoax.
 Make people care, either positively or negativelythe ambiguities encourage interest and debate

Types

Hoaxes vary widely in their processes of creation, propagation, and entrenchment over time. Examples include:
 Academic hoaxes:
 The Sokal affair
 The Grievance studies affair
 Art-world hoaxes:
 The "Bruno Hat" art hoax, arranged in London in July 1929, involved staging a convincing public exhibition of paintings by an imaginary reclusive artist, Bruno Hat. All the perpetrators were well-educated and did not intend a fraud, as the newspapers were informed the next day. Those involved included Brian Howard, Evelyn Waugh, Bryan Guinness, John Banting and Tom Mitford
 Nat Tate: An American Artist 1928-1960: a 1998 art world hoax, by William Boyd
 Disumbrationism: a modern art hoax
 Pierre Brassau: exposing art critics to "modern paintings" made by a chimpanzee
 Spectra: A Book of Poetic Experiments: a modernist poetry hoax
 Ern Malley, the popular but fictitious Australian poet
 Apocryphal claims that originate as a hoax gain widespread belief among members of a culture or organization, become entrenched as persons who believe it repeat it in good faith to others, and continue to command that belief after the hoax's originators have died or departed
 Computer virus hoaxes became widespread as viruses themselves began to spread. A typical hoax is an email message warning recipients of a non-existent threat, usually forging quotes supposedly from authorities such as Microsoft and IBM. In most cases the payload is an exhortation to distribute the message to everyone in the recipient's address book. Thus the e-mail "warning" is itself the "virus." Sometimes the hoax is more harmful, e.g., telling the recipient to seek a particular file (usually in a Microsoft Windows operating system); if the file is found, the computer is deemed to be infected unless it is deleted. In reality the file is one required by the operating system for correct functioning of the computer.
 Criminal Hoaxing, such as the case of John Samuel Humble, aka Wearside Jack. Criminal hoaxing diverts time and money of police investigations with communications purporting to come from the actual criminal. Once caught, hoaxers are charged under criminal codes such as Perverting the course of justice
 Factoids
 Hoaxes formed by making minor or gradually increasing changes to a warning or other claims widely circulated for legitimate purposes
 Hoax of exposure is a semi-comical or private sting operation. It usually encourages people to act foolishly or credulously by falling for patent nonsense that the hoaxer deliberately presents as reality. A related activity is culture jamming.
 Hoax news
 Hoaxes perpetrated by "scare tactics" appealing to the audience's subjectively rational belief that the expected cost of not believing the hoax (the cost if its assertions are true times the likelihood of their truth) outweighs the expected cost of believing the hoax (cost if false times likelihood of falsity), such as claims that a non-malicious but unfamiliar program on one's computer is malware
 Hoaxes perpetrated on occasions when their initiation is considered socially appropriate, such as April Fools' Day
 Humbugs
 Internet hoaxes became more common after the start of social media. Some websites have been used to hoax millions of people on the Web
 Paleoanthropological hoaxes, anthropologists were taken in by the "Piltdown Man discovery" that was widely believed from 1913 to 1953
 Religious hoaxes
 UFO hoaxes
 Urban legends and rumors with a probable conscious attempt to deceive

Hoax news

Hoax news (also referred to as fake news) is a news report containing facts that are either inaccurate or false but which are presented as genuine. A hoax news report conveys a half-truth used deliberately to mislead the public.

Hoax may serve the goal of propaganda or disinformation – using social media to drive web traffic and amplify their effect. Unlike news satire, fake news websites seek to mislead, rather than entertain, readers for financial or political gain.

Hoax news is usually released with the intention of misleading to injure an organization, individual, or person, and/or benefit financially or politically, sometimes utilizing sensationalist, deceptive, or simply invented headlines to maximize readership. Likewise, clickbait reports and articles from this operation gain advertisement revenue.

See also

 
 
 
 
 
 
 
 
 
 
 
 
 List of hoaxes

References

Further reading
 MacDougall, Curtis D. (1958) [1940]  Hoaxes. [revised ed.] New York: Dover

External links

 The Culture Jammer’s Encyclopedia
 Snopes – Urban Legends Reference Pages
 The Greatest Hoaxes of All Time  – slideshow by Life magazine
 "What's All This Hoax Stuff, Anyhow?" (Bob Pease article on Electronic Design website)
 Chloe and Keith's Wedding hoax – link to video and commentary at USA Today
 Leyendas Urbanas  – Urban Legends and Hoaxes in Spanish

 
Deception
Fraud